Gang Jo (964 – 31 December 1010) was a Goryeo general who came from the noble family in Sincheon, Hwanghae-do and served under King Mokjong of Goryeo and King Hyeonjong of Goryeo. General Gang Jo was a general in charge of the Northern border army and came from the Sincheon Gang clan, those made Gang become the relative of King Taejo's 22nd wife, Lady Sinjuwon.

Rise to power
When scholar-official Kim Chi-yang burned the royal palace to the ground, threatening to kill the king and take over, King Mokjong called General Gang Jo to the capital city of Kaesong. General Gang Jo immediately executed Kim Chi-yang and his supporters.

Then, the scholar officials, enemies of Gang Jo, spread rumors and lies that the general was planning to take over the government for himself. These rumors reached the King, and he planned to kill Gang Jo. Gang Jo heard of the conspiracy and doubts of the King, and ordered his army to attack and kill all of his enemies, including the King. After assassinating King Mokjong, General Gang placed King Hyeonjong of Goryeo on the throne.

War with the Liao and death

Soon after this, Emperor Shengzong of Liao attacked Goryeo during the fall of 1010 in an attempt to kill Gang Jo for killing the Goryeo King. According to the Korean source, 400,000-man Liao army invaded Goryeo territory. Liao first attacked but failed to capture the fort of Hueng hwa, whose lord was General Yang Gyu.

Next, the Liao finally headed to the city of Tong-Ju, which is where General Gang Jo and 30,000 Goryeo troops were waiting. General Gang Jo set up an ambush on a narrow pass that the Liao army was inevitably going to have to pass. There, he directly led his troops in a three-pronged attack when the Liao came. The Liao soldiers were forced to retreat and 10,000 died during this ambush. The enemy troops again attacked Tong-Ju city but faced a humiliating defeat with severe casualties.

The Liao commander launched another attack on the city, with Gang Jo as his main target. The Liao were defeated a third time, and were forced to retreat once more. In one last-ditch effort, the Liao army came attacking once more, but this time, General Gang Jo did not directly orchestrate the attack and played Badok with one of his lieutenants instead, thinking that victory was a given. In the same time, Liao general Yelupennu led the Khitan army to attack and capture the Sanshu fortress. However, after hearing the source Gang Jo did not take any measures to defend Khitan force. Then one of Gang Jo's men told his plan to the Liao. Liao soldiers pierced through the city's defenses. After the Khitan army launched a surprise attack, the Goryeo army was defeated, finally 30,000 Goryeo soldiers were killed and Gang Jo was captured. General Gang refused to surrender to the Liao Emperor, who in turn executed Gang.

Place in history and comparison to Yeon Gaesomun
Gang Jo is seen as a hero. Though his rule was a time of war against the invading Liao, not many deaths were ordered by the general with the exception of King Mokjong and the conspiring scholar-officials. Gang Jo can be compared with his predecessor Yeon Gaesomun of Goguryeo, who had also killed a King of Goguryeo for conspiring against him.

Gang Jo, however, was not as brilliant as Yeon Gaesomun, as he was not able to keep control for very long. Gang Jo did bring great victories to Goryeo over the Liao dynasty, but his death brought about another period of trouble for Goryeo, just as Yeon Gaesomun's death had done to Goguryeo. Gang Jo can be seen as a smaller-scale version of Yeon Gaesomun.

Family
Father: Gang Tae-ju (강태주, 康泰周)
Daughter: Lady Gang (부인 강씨, 夫人 康氏)
Son-in-law: Gim Jin-yu (김진유, 金振酉)
Grandson: Gim Seung-ui (김승의, 金承意)
Grandson: Gim Gye-ui (김계의, 金繼意)
Grandson: Gim Jin-ui (김진의, 金進意)

In popular culture
 Portrayed by Choi Jae-sung in the 2009 KBS2 TV series Empress Cheonchu.

See also
 Goryeo
 Dictators of Goryeo

References

10th-century Korean people
Korean generals
1010 deaths
Year of birth unknown
Sincheon Kang clan
964 births